A leadership spill for the federal leadership of the National Party of Australia was held on 30 May 2022. The spill follows the federal election in which the Coalition, of which the Nationals form part, lost government, earlier in the same month. The incumbent leader, Barnaby Joyce, had served as Deputy Prime Minister in the outgoing government. He lost against his deputy David Littleproud, who was elected party leader.

A separate leadership vote for the National Party's Coalition partner Liberal Party was also held on the same day.

Background
The Coalition lost the 2022 Australian federal election to the Labor opposition led by Anthony Albanese. There was significant media coverage surrounding the impact that comments made by Nationals politicians had on the loss of Liberal seats to independents, Labor and the Greens, particularly surrounding climate policy. The Nationals do not officially release the results of party leadership elections.

It is custom in the party for an automatic leadership spill to be triggered at the beginning of a new parliament.

Candidates
 Darren Chester, former Minister for Veterans' Affairs
 David Littleproud, incumbent Deputy Leader and former Minister for Agriculture and Northern Australia
 Barnaby Joyce, incumbent leader and former Deputy Prime Minister

Results 
Littleproud won the spill and became the new party leader, with Perin Davey as his deputy. Even though Davey was a Senator, Bridget McKenzie was elected and remained leader of the Nationals in the Senate.

Notes

References 

National Party of Australia
May 2022 events in Australia
Australian leadership spills
National Party of Australia leadership spill
2022 elections in Australia